Elsemia Marianne Helene "Els" van Noorduyn (born 25 May 1946) is a retired Dutch shot putter who finished in eighth place at the 1968 Summer Olympics with a throw of 16.23 m.

She runs her sports-related company Els van Noorduyn B.V.

References

External links 

 

1946 births
Living people
Athletes (track and field) at the 1968 Summer Olympics
Dutch female shot putters
Olympic athletes of the Netherlands
Athletes from Amsterdam